Onofrio de Ponte (died 1676) was a Roman Catholic prelate who served as Bishop of Lettere-Gragnano (1650–1676).

Biography
On 22 August 1650, Onofrio de Ponte was appointed during the papacy of Pope Innocent X as Bishop of Lettere-Gragnano.
He served as Bishop of Lettere-Gragnano until his death on 13 May 1676.

References

External links and additional sources
 (for Chronology of Bishops) 
 (for Chronology of Bishops)  

17th-century Italian Roman Catholic bishops
Bishops appointed by Pope Innocent X
1676 deaths